Miao Chunting (May 1919 – 17 September 2020) was a PRC politician. He was born in Shandong Province. He was twice Chairman of the Chinese People's Political Consultative Conference Committee of Guizhou (1959–1967, 1980–1993).

References

1919 births
2020 deaths
People's Republic of China politicians from Shandong
Chinese Communist Party politicians from Shandong
Political office-holders in Guizhou
Members of the 7th Chinese People's Political Consultative Conference
CPPCC Chairmen of Guizhou
Chinese centenarians
Men centenarians